SoRI-9804 is a positive allosteric modulator of dopamine transporters. Unlike others in its series & traditional DRI ligands, it inhibits the release of dopamine in addition to inhibiting the reuptake of released dopamine back into the transporter.

See also 
SoRI-20041

References

Quinazolines